The 16th arrondissement of Paris is the westernmost of the 20 arrondissements of the capital city of France. Located on the Right Bank, it is adjacent to the 17th and 8th arrondissements to the northeast, and to Boulogne-Billancourt to the southwest. Opposite the Seine are the 7th and 15th arrondissements.

Other museums and cultural venues are located in this arrondissement, including the Louis Vuitton Foundation opened in 2014.

With its ornate 19th-century buildings, large avenues, prestigious schools, museums, and various parks, the arrondissement has long been known as one of French high society's favourite places of residence (comparable to London's Kensington and Chelsea or Berlin's Charlottenburg) to such an extent that the  phrase  has been associated with great wealth in French popular culture.

The , the second-largest public park in Paris (behind only the ), is also located in this arrondissement.

History
The 16th arrondissement was created by the Law of 16 June 1859 which incorporated the former villages (now Parisian neighborhoods) of Auteuil, Passy and Chaillot into Paris; these villages had become communes after the French Revolution and had been in the Seine department ever since. When the law of 1859 was drafted, it was planned that these villages would form a new arrondissement that would be numbered the 13th arrondissement, but "The rich and powerful moving in did not like the number. They pulled strings and became the 16th, the unlucky association and postmark being transferred to the blameless but less influential folks around Porte d'Italie."

Geography
The land area of this arrondissement is 16.305 km2 ( or 4,029 acres), slightly more than half of which consists of the Bois de Boulogne park. Excluding the Bois de Boulogne, its land area is 7.846 km2 ( or 1,939 acres). It is the largest arrondissement in Paris in terms of land area.

Demographics and politics

The 16th arrondissement population peaked in 1962, when it had 227,418 inhabitants. At the last census (2009), the population was 169,372. The 16th arrondissement contains a great deal of business activity; in 1999 it hosted 106,971 jobs.

The 16th arrondissement is commonly thought to be one of the richest parts of Paris (see Auteuil-Neuilly-Passy), and features some of the most expensive real estate in France including the famous Auteuil "villas", heirs to 19th century high society country houses, they are exclusive gated communities with huge houses surrounded by gardens, which is extremely rare in Paris. It is also the only arrondissement in Paris to be divided into two separate postal codes. The southern part of the arrondissement carries a postal code of 75016, while the northern part has the code of 75116.

Politics

The 16th arrondissement is one of the strongest areas in the country for the French right. In 2017, it gave over 58% of its votes in the first round to right-wing candidate François Fillon; amidst a poor national result of only 20%. It then went on to vote for Emmanuel Macron by a landslide in the runoff.

Historical population

Immigration

Economy
Four Fortune Global 500 have their head offices in this arrondissement: PSA Peugeot Citroën, Lafarge, and Veolia. In addition Lagardère and Technip have their headquarters in this arrondissement.

At one time Aérospatiale had its head office in the arrondissement.

Movies filmed in the 16th arrondissement
In one of the opening scenes of the 1965 James Bond film Thunderball, character Emilio Largo is seen arriving at the headquarters of The International Brotherhood for the Assistance of Stateless Persons. This scene was shot on Avenue d'Eylau in the 16th arrondissement.

The 1972 film Last Tango in Paris was filmed at various locations in the 16th arrondissement, with the apartment the characters stayed in being located in Passy.

Education

Primary and secondary schools 

Here is a list of domestic French sixth-form colleges/high schools in the arrondissement
 Lycée Saint-Jean de Passy
 Lycée Saint-Louis-de-Gonzague
 Lycée Janson-de-Sailly
 Lycée Claude-Bernard
 Lycée Jean-Baptiste-Say
 Lycée Gerson
 Lycée Molière
 Lycée La Fontaine (Lycée Jean-de-la-Fontaine)
 Lycée Octave-Feuillet
 Lycée Notre-Dame des Oiseaux
 
 
 Institut de La Tour
 Lycée René-Cassin
 École normale israélite orientale (Paris) (fr
 
 Cours privé Beauséjour
 École d'esthétique Yves Rocher
 Ipécom Paris
 Lycée Moria-Diane Benvenuti
 Lycée Passy-Saint-Honoré
 Lycée Sainte-Thérèse

International schools:
Colegio Español Federico García Lorca, a Spanish international primary school owned by the Spanish government The Spanish secondary school, Liceo Español Luis Buñuel, is located in Neuilly sur Seine.
The two campuses of the International School of Paris
Kingsworth International School

Undergraduate and postgraduate studies 
The Université Paris-Dauphine is in the arrondissement, as well as Paris Institute of Technology, part of Paris Descartes University, one of Paris biggest public universities.

The renowned "classes préparatoires" establishment Intégrale : Institut d'enseignement supérieur privé have one of their campuses in the arrondissement.

Supplementary schools 
The École de langue japonaise de Paris (パリ日本語補習校 Pari Nihongo Hoshūkō), a supplementary Japanese education programme, is held at the École Maternelle et Primaire Saint Francois d'Eylau in the 16th arrondissement. The school has its offices at the Association Amicale des Ressortissants Japonais en France (AARJF) in the 8th arrondissement.

Cityscape

Neighborhoods
 Auteuil
 Chaillot
 Passy

Places of interest

 Fondation Louis Vuitton
 Cimetière de Passy
 Parc des Princes
 Palais de Tokyo
 Pavillon de l'eau
 Lycée Janson-de-Sailly
 Maison de Radio France
 Maison de Balzac
 Fondation Le Corbusier
 Guimet Museum
 Jardin d'Acclimatation
 Jardin des Serres d'Auteuil
 Mona Bismarck American Center
 Musée Arménien de France
 Musée d'Art Dentaire Pierre Fauchard
 Musée Baccarat
 Musée Clemenceau
 Musée de la Contrefaçon
 Musée d'Ennery
 Musée Galliera
 Musée Marmottan Monet
 New York University's distinguished Paris campus.
 Organisation for Economic Co-operation and Development
 Château de la Muette
 International School of Paris
 Tenniseum

Main streets and squares
 Trocadéro
 Musée national de la Marine
 Musée de l'Homme
 Musée national des Monuments Français
 Musée du Cinéma Henri Langlois
 Théâtre national de Chaillot
 Avenue Foch
 84 Avenue Foch
 Place de l'Étoile and Arc de Triomphe (partial)
 Rue Nungesser et Coli, named after the disappeared aviators of the 1927 biplane L'Oiseau Blanc (The White Bird).

See also

Notes

References

External links